Sameer Rajda is an Indian actor who works in the Gujarati cinema. He is the son of writer and director Mulraj Rajda.

Filmography

Films
 Desh Re Joya Dada Pardesh Joya (1998)
 Jai Sikotar Maa (1998)
 Toran Badhao Ho Raaj (2003)

Television

References

Indian male television actors
Living people
1963 births